The 1962 Jackson State Tigers football team was an American football team that represented Jackson State College for Negroes—now known as Jackson State University as a member of the Southwestern Athletic Conference (SWAC) during the 1962 NCAA College Division football season. In their 11th season under head coach John Merritt, the Eagles compiled an overall record of 10–1 record with a mark of 6–1 against conference opponents, won the SWAC title, defeated Florida A&M in the Orange Blossom Classic, and outscored all opponents by a total of 411 to 101.

The Tigers were recognized by the Pittsburgh Courier as the 1962 black college national champion. Another source selected Florida A&M as the national champion despite Jackson State's 22–6 victory over Florida A&M in the Orange Blossom Classic.

Key players for Jackson State included quarterback Roy Curry and end Willie Richardson. Richardson was later inducted into the College Football Hall of Fame.

At the start of the fall 1962 semester, James Meredith drew national attention when he transferred from Jackson State to the previously all-white University of Mississippi.

Schedule

References

Jackson State
Jackson State Tigers football seasons
Southwestern Athletic Conference football champion seasons
Black college football national champions
Jackson State Tigers football